Emil Scherrer (10 April 1911 – 26 May 2006) was an architect who with Kenneth Hicks founded the firm of Scherrer and Hicks shortly after the Second World War when Scherrer was commissioned to design the first petro-chemical plant to be built in the United Kingdom. Other works included schools, laboratories, buildings for the water industry and the Manchester University Mathematics Tower (1968) with Edmund Percey.

His firm was continued by Edmund Percey as Edmund Percey Scherrer and Hicks which still trades.

References 

1911 births
2006 deaths
Architects from Manchester
Alumni of the University of Manchester
Fellows of the Royal Institute of British Architects
Academics of the University of Westminster
English people of Swiss descent